3-Indolepropionic acid (IPA), or indole-3-propionic acid, is a potent neuroprotective antioxidant, plant auxin, and natural product in humans that was being studied for therapeutic use in Alzheimer's disease as of 2002. It is endogenously produced by human microbiota and has only been detected in vivo when the species Clostridium sporogenes is present in the gastrointestinal tract. , C. sporogenes, which uses tryptophan to synthesize IPA, is the only species of bacteria known to synthesize IPA in vivo at levels which are subsequently detectable in the blood plasma of the host.

IPA is an even more potent scavenger of hydroxyl radicals than melatonin, the most potent scavenger of hydroxyl radicals that is synthesized by human enzymes. Similar to melatonin but unlike other antioxidants, it scavenges radicals without subsequently generating reactive and pro-oxidant intermediate compounds. In 2017, elevated concentrations of IPA in human blood plasma were found to be correlated with a lower risk of type 2 diabetes and higher consumption of fiber-rich foods.

Biosynthesis in humans and cellular effects

Metabolism
IPA can be converted in the liver or kidneys to 3-indoleacrylic acid, which is subsequently conjugated with glycine, forming indolylacryloyl glycine.

History 
The neuroprotective, antioxidant, and anti-amyloid properties of IPA were first reported by a group of investigators in July 1999, led by Dr. Pappolla and Dr. Poeggeler at the University of South Alabama.

See also 
 Indolepropionamide

References 

Antioxidants
Indoles
Propionic acids
Auxins
Biomolecules